B.T. Connor Reserve (also commonly known as Genis Steel Stadium due to naming rights) is the home of the Preston Lions football club. It has room for about 8,000 spectators with 1,000 seats.

B.T. Connor Reserve has four football (soccer) pitches, and is where the juniors and the women's teams of the Preston Lions train and play their matches.

Redelvopment
The new pavilion at B.T. Connor Reserve will feature four change rooms equipped with toilets and showers, and a new community space for social purposes.

The club's facilities at B.T Connor Reserve will undergo a $3 million re-development which will tie in nicely with the start of the National Second Division. 
The new look ground will include upgraded change rooms, medical facilities, a purpose built social area with a new bar and kitchen, undercover seating for fans, media facilities, disability friendly access to the pavilion and top notch lighting.

References

External links

Preston Lions FC
Preston Lions Archive Page

Soccer venues in Melbourne
Sports venues in Melbourne
Preston Lions FC
Buildings and structures in the City of Darebin
Sport in the City of Darebin